Body Snatchers is a cover album by Iron Lung Corp, released in September 2013 by Cracknation Records.

Track listing

Personnel
Adapted from the Body Snatchers liner notes.

Iron Lung Corp
 Wade Alin – programming (8)
 Dan Brill – drums (6, 11)
 Dan Dinsmore – drums (1, 8, 12)
 Eliot Engelman – bass guitar (8, 11, 12)
 Brian Elza – guitar (3, 6)
 Brian McGarvey – guitar (1, 8, 12)
 Gregory A. Lopez – bass guitar (3, 4, 6)
 Daniel Neet – guitar (1), vocals (8), cover art
 Jason Novak – programming (1, 3, 4, 5, 6, 8, 9, 10, 11), vocals (1, 3, 5, 6, 9, 11), guitar (2, 4, 6, 9), bass guitar (5)
 Ethan Novak – guitar (5, 7, 9, 11, 12), drums (1, 3), vocals (5), 
 Sean Payne – programming (1, 2, 12)
 Eric Powell – vocals (4, 6), guitar (4), programming (4)
 Steven Seibold – programming (5, 6, 10), guitar (10), vocals (10), bass guitar (10)

Additional musicians
 Kelly Britton – guest vocals (3)

Release history

References

External links 
 Body Snatchers at Discogs (list of releases)

2013 albums
Iron Lung Corp albums